Cuban silver certificates were banknotes issued by the Cuban government between 1934 and 1949 (and circulated from 1935 to the early 1950s). Prior and subsequent issues of Cuban banknotes were engraved and printed by nongovernmental private bank note companies in the United States, but the series from 1934 to 1949 were designed, engraved, and printed by the US government at the Bureau of Engraving and Printing (BEP).

The first Cuban banknotes were issued in 1857 for the El Banco Español De La Habana. Beginning in the late 1860s, Cuba contracted the National Bank Note Company (NBNC) for two issues of banknotes in 1869 and 1872. After absorbing NBNC, the American Bank Note Company (ABNC) engraved and printed Cuban banknotes for issues in 1889, 1896, 1897, 1905 for the National Bank of Cuba, 1944, and a 1949–50 issue for the Banco Nacional De Cuba (printed until 1960). Between 1905 and the introduction of BEP issued Cuban silver certificates in 1934, no banknotes were produced.

Cuban silver certificates made by the Bureau of Engraving and Printing

The legal foundation for the issuance of Cuban silver certificates began with a Cuban law passed on 10 May 1933 that authorized the production of $6,000,000 in silver pesos in order to back an equal number of silver certificates. On 11 December 1933, the Cuban government had announced that it planned to issue a total of $17,000,000 in silver certificates.
In a letter dated 2 March 1934, Cuban Ambassador Manuel Márquez Sterling wrote to Secretary of State Cordell Hull requesting that the Bureau of Engraving and Printing (BEP) prepare silver certificates on behalf of the Republic of Cuba. The coining of Cuban silver pesos began pursuant to Decree-Law No. 93 (22 March 1934) and it was announced that both the coins and banknotes would be produced by the United States. Treasury Secretary Henry Morgenthau, Jr. gave initial authorization to the Cuban request to engage the BEP on 23 April 1934. Though not exhaustive, there were several additional legal changes to Cuba's financial infrastructure. Silver certificates could be used to pay duties, taxes and other fees, without limit (Decree-Law No. 153, 19 April 1934) and should be accepted in the same manner as silver coins (Decree-Law No. 176, 27 April 1934). On 11 May 1934 the design process began at the Bureau of Engraving and Printing.

Development and production
The physical specifications for the Cuban issue were roughly the same size as US notes – printed on the same Crane & Co. 75% linen 25% cotton blend (but only containing red security fibers versus red and blue). The seal and serial numbers printed in red, 12 notes per sheet, with the facsimile signatures of the Secretario de Hacienda (left) and Presidente de la República (right).

Approval is required at major stages in the design of any currency. BEP procedure at the time required an approval signature on the artist's renderings and proof mock-ups.  Eduardo I. Montoulieu served as an authorized delegate of the Cuban government during the design and engraving phases.  In 1915, Montoulieu served as a technical representative for Cuba during the minting of Cuban coins at the Philadelphia Mint. His approval of the Series 1934 BEP designs can be seen on the background matte. Montoulieu would later become Cuban Treasury Secretary three times during two administrations.

Issuance
Between 1934 (when the BEP was engaged to produce the silver certificates) and 1949 (the delivery of the last series of notes) Cuba's government was fairly volatile. In the space of 15 years, Cuba had seven leaders: Carlos Mendieta, José Agripino Barnet, Miguel Mariano Gómez,  Federico Laredo Brú, Fulgencio Batista, Ramón Grau, and Carlos Prío Socarrás. In the same period of time, Cuba's Ministry of the Treasury changed leadership at least 20 times.

Series 1934
On 25 June 1934, Cuban Secretary of Communications Gabriel Landa replaced outgoing Treasury Secretary Saenz. Four months later (29 October 1934), Landa was replaced by Manuel Despaigne and became Secretary of National Defense. He resigned his cabinet position at the end of November, three weeks before an arrest warrant was issued (15 December 1934) charging him with embezzlement. The BEP received instructions from the Cuban government to replace the Landa signature with Despaigne which was put into effect in December 1934. A small number of one and five peso notes with Landa's signature had already been printed but were never issued. Original art and mock-ups for both versions (part of the National Numismatic Collection, NMAH) can be seen in the tables below.

Series 1936

See also

 Cuban peso

References

Footnotes

Notes

Bibliography

Further reading

Economy of Cuba
Currencies of the Caribbean
Government of Cuba
Banknotes of Cuba
Cuba–United States relations